The William Steele & Sons Company was an architectural firm in Philadelphia, Pennsylvania.  It was founded by William Steele (1839-1908).

William Steele immigrated to the United States in 1846, and by 1864 he was a carpenter and house builder in North Philadelphia.  By 1881 he and son Joseph M. Steele had formed a form, which by 1886 they was listed as "William Steele & Son, Carpenters and Builders".  The "Son" was pluralized after John Lyle Steele joined the firm in 1900, and "Company" was added by 1908.

Several of its works are listed on the National Register of Historic Places.

Works include (with attribution):
Lee Tire and Rubber Company (1909), 1100 Hector St., in Whitemarsh, PA (a Philadelphia suburb) (Steele, William), NRHP-listed
Drueding Brothers Company Building, 437-441 W. Master St. Philadelphia, PA (William Steele & Sons), NRHP-listed 
Steel Heddle Manufacturing Company Complex (1919), 2100 W Allegheny Ave Philadelphia, PA (William Steele & Sons Co.), NRHP-listed
Terminal Commerce Building, 401 N. Broad St. Philadelphia, PA, (William Steele & Sons Co.), NRHP-listed
N. Snellenburg Company Department Store Warehouse, 1825-1851 N. 10th St. Philadelphia, PA (William Steele and Sons Company), NRHP-listed 
General Electric Switchgear Plant, Seventh and Willow Sts. Philadelphia, PA (William Steele & Co.), NRHP-listed
Harris Building, 2121-41 Market St. Philadelphia, PA (William Steele & Sons Company), NRHP-listed
Snellenburg's Clothing Factory, 642 N. Broad St. Philadelphia, PA (William Steele Co.), NRHP-listed
Quaker City Dye Works, 100-118 W. Oxford St. Philadelphia, PA (William Steele & Sons), NRHP-listed

References

Architecture firms based in Pennsylvania
Architects from Pennsylvania